In the Bloodlit Dark is the second album by the instrumental band Zoar. The band's label describes this as the "lost album."

Track listing
 Wisteria   5:55  
 In the Bloodlit Dark   4:41  
 Nemo   5:31  
 Child of God   3:30  
 Spiderlace   6:05  
 Ghosts and Molecules   7:51  
 The Beauty of Obscenity   5:32  
 Nothing But This Light   3:39  
 A System of Senses   5:40  
 Another Sky   11:35  
 Secrets of the Dead   5:54

References

External links 
Band's official website
Album's official website

Zoar (band) albums
Instrumental albums
2001 albums